Akhethetep Hemi was an ancient Egyptian official at the end of the Fifth Dynasty, most likely in office under king Unas. His highest title was that of a vizier, making him to the most important official at the royal court, only second to the king. Next to the vizier's titles he was also overseer of the treasuries, overseer of the scribes of the king's document and overseer of the double granary, all these are important position at the royal court.

Akhethetep Hemi is mainly known from his mastaba not far from the Pyramid of Unas, that was excavated and published by Selim Hassan. The mastaba was later usurped by an official called Nebkauher. It remains often difficult to decide which titles in the tomb decoration belong to one or the other official.

References

Literature 

Viziers of the Fifth Dynasty of Egypt
Overseer of the treasury